Fog and Sun (Spanish:Niebla y sol) is a 1951 Spanish film directed by José María Forqué.

Cast 
 Antonio
 Xan das Bolas
 Modesto Cid
 Roberto Font
 Mara Jerez
 Francisco Melgares
 José María Mompín
 Carlos Muñoz
 Consuelo de Nieva
 María Dolores Pradera
 Rosario
 Asunción Sancho
 Julio Sanjuán
 Aníbal Vela

References

Bibliography 
 Mira, Alberto. Historical Dictionary of Spanish Cinema. Scarecrow Press, 2010.

External links 
 

1951 films
1950s Spanish-language films
Films directed by José María Forqué
Spanish black-and-white films
1950s Spanish films